Micky (born Miguel Ángel Carreño Schmelter October 20, 1943, in Madrid) is a Spanish singer.

He began his music career in 1962 leading the band Micky y Los Tonys, which brought out 30 singles (including hits like "No sé nadar") and 5 albums. Meanwhile, Micky acted in some films as it was usual for singers in Spain in the 1960s and worked for Cadena SER as a radio presenter.

Micky began his solo music career in the 1970s. Some of his first hits were "Soy así" and "El chico de la armónica". The single "Bye bye fräulein" (1976) entered the charts in Germany, Luxembourg and the Netherlands, and made the Billboard Easy Listening charts in the United States. In 1977 he was chosen to participate for Spain at the 1977 Eurovision Song Contest. With the song "Enséñame a cantar", he placed 9th in a field of 18 entries.

In the 1980s and 1990s, he continued his music career but also focusing on theatre and television. In 2003 he participated in the television contest Vivo Cantando, which featured former pop stars. In 2010 he released a new album, La Cuenta Atrás.

References

External links
Official site

Living people
Singers from Madrid
Spanish male singers
Eurovision Song Contest entrants for Spain
Eurovision Song Contest entrants of 1977
1943 births